{{DISPLAYTITLE:C7H16O}}
The molecular formula C7H16O may refer to:
 tert-Amyl ethyl ether
 3-Ethylpentan-3-ol
 Heptanols
 1-Heptanol
 2-Heptanol
 3-Heptanol